Robert James Johns (May 22, 1932 – March 7, 2016) was an American race car driver.

Johns raced in the NASCAR series in the 1956–1969 seasons, with 141 career starts. He had two wins among his 36 top ten finishes and finished the 1960 season 3rd in the points. He also attempted to qualify for the Indianapolis 500 seven times and succeeded in both 1965 and 1969, where he finished 7th and 10th, respectively.

Johns was able to race in NASCAR regardless of being conscripted into the United States Army.

Johns died on March 7, 2016, in his Miami, Florida home at age 83.

Indianapolis 500 results

References

Bobby Johns at the 1965 Gwny Staley 500
In Memory of Robert James Johns

1932 births
2016 deaths
Indianapolis 500 drivers
NASCAR drivers
Racing drivers from Miami
United States Army soldiers